Hugo Walser was a Swiss field hockey player. He competed in the men's tournament at the 1948 Summer Olympics.

References

External links
 

Year of birth missing
Year of death missing
Swiss male field hockey players
Olympic field hockey players of Switzerland
Field hockey players at the 1948 Summer Olympics
Place of birth missing